Sindagi Vidhana Sabha seat is one of 224 assembly constituencies in Karnataka State, in India. It is part of Bijapur (Lok Sabha constituency).

Members of Assembly

Bombay State (Indi Sindgi Constituency)
 1951 (Seat-1): Surpur Mallappa Karabasappa, Indian National Congress
 1951 (Seat-2): Jattappa Laxman Kabadi, Indian National Congress

Mysore State (Sindgi Constituency)
 1957: Shankaragouda Yeshawantgouda Patil, Indian National Congress
 1962: Channappa Madiwalappa Desai, Indian National Congress
 1967: Channappa Madiwalappa Desai, Indian National Congress
 1972: S. Y. Patil, Indian National Congress (Organisation)

Karnataka State (Sindgi Constituency)
 1978: Bekinalkar Maibubsaheb Hasansanheb, Indian National Congress (Indira)
 1983: Ninganagoud Rachana Goud Patil, Indian National Congress
 1985: Mallanagouda Doulataraya Biradar, Janata Party
 1989: Rayagondappa Bheemanna Choudhari, Indian National Congress
 1994: Managuli Mallappa Channaveerappa, Janata Dal
 1999: Sharanappa Tippanna Sunagar, Indian National Congress
 2004: Ashok Gurappa Shabadi, Bharatiya Janata Party
 2008: Ramesh Balappa Bhusanur, Bharatiya Janata Party
 2013: Ramesh Balappa Bhusanur, Bharatiya Janata Party
 2018: Managuli Mallappa Channaveerappa, Janata Dal (Secular)
 2021 (By-Poll): Ramesh Balappa Bhusanur, Bharatiya Janata Party

Election results

2021 By-election

2018 Assembly Election

1967 Assembly Election
 C. M. Desai (INC) : 16,668 votes  
 S. Y. Patil (IND) : 13,298

See also 
 List of constituencies of Karnataka Legislative Assembly

References 

Assembly constituencies of Karnataka